The first Wever-Croes cabinet was the cabinet of Aruba from 17 November 2017 to 20 September 2021. It was formed by a coalition government of the political parties People's Electoral Movement (MEP), Proud and Respected People (POR) and Democratic Network (RED), and was led by Prime Minister Evelyn Wever-Croes. It was the country's first coalition government in sixteen years and the first cabinet to be headed by a woman.

The cabinet served during the late 2010s and the start of the 2020s. Notable issues during the first Wever-Croes cabinet included the COVID-19 pandemic in Aruba, and the corruption case Flamingo. The cabinet fell on 30 March 2021, after an investigation had been launched into the possible embezzlement of public money by coalition party POR. It continued to serve as a demissionary cabinet until 20 September 2021.

Formation 
Shortly after the 2017 general election, the parties MEP (9 seats), POR (2 seats) and RED (1 seat) agreed to form a coalition government, thereby excluding the Aruban People's Party (AVP), which had received the most votes. Although the coalition parties initially wanted to form a government consisting of seven ministers, they ultimately compromised at having eight, with five ministries going to MEP, two to POR and one to RED. The position of Minister Plenipotentiary also went to MEP.

The cabinet's coalition agreement was titled "Together for Aruba". The parties agreed that the most important issues that needed to be addressed were the financial situation, political integrity, and the wellbeing of Aruban citizens. The cabinet was sworn in by Governor Alfonso Boekhoudt on 17 November 2017.

Notable events

Resignation of Otmar Oduber 
On 12 December 2019, Deputy Prime Minister and Minister of Infrastructure and Environment Otmar Oduber resigned from his position, stating health, family and personal reasons. In June 2020, judicial authorities conducted a search of Oduber's house in relation to the corruption case Flamingo.

Dismissal of Marisol Lopez-Tromp 
In July 2020, tensions ran high within the cabinet when Minister of Justice and Immigration Andin Bikker and the POR party withdrew their confidence in Oduber's replacement as Minister of Infrastructure and Environment, Marisol Lopez-Tromp. A Parliament meeting that had been organized to discuss a motion of no confidence in Lopez-Tromp was postponed at the last minute to allow for a mediation attempt in the Prime Minister's office. POR threatened to let the government lose its majority if Lopez-Tromp would not be dismissed.

On 22 October 2020, Lopez-Tromp was dismissed from the cabinet, as the majority of the cabinet, as well as a majority in Parliament, stated they did not support her anymore. Prime Minister Wever-Croes took over her portfolio. Wever-Croes stated that having Lopez-Tromp in the cabinet led to an "unworkable situation" and a loss of citizens' confidence in the government. Lopez-Tromp stated that her anti-corruption policy and the continued influence of former minister Oduber within the government were the main reasons she clashed with her party, the cabinet and Parliament.

Composition

References 

Wever-Croes 1
Cabinets established in 2017
Cabinets disestablished in 2021
Coalition governments